Rex Garrod (10 September 1943 – 8 April 2019) was an inventor and roboteer notable for building the radio controlled car that starred in Brum, and co-presenting The Secret Life of Machines.
He also entered several successful robots into the early series of British TV series Robot Wars.

Early and personal life
Garrod grew up in Mickfield, Suffolk. He was a speedway rider for the Ipswich Witches (1971) and Scunthorpe Saints (1972–74). He and former motorcross racer Dave Bickers then moved into special effects.

Garrod married Sally in 1992, and they had two daughters. He had Alzheimer's disease for the last eight years of his life, and died on 8 April 2019, aged 75.

Television work

Brum was a British television series which ran intermittently between 1991 and 2002. It told the story of a small car called Brum, which in reality was a giant remote control car. Garrod is credited with both designing and building Brum. He also made devices on the children's programme Teletubbies.

Garrod co-presented Channel 4's The Secret Life of Machines with Tim Hunkin, another inventor from the same county.

Robot Wars
Garrod was Team Leader of Team Cassius, a team of roboteers which entered several robots into Series 1, 2 and 3 of Robot Wars. In addition to the performances of his robots, he was known for his generosity in helping other teams fix their robots.

In Series 1, Team Cassius entered "Recyclopse", which reached the Grand Final but lost to Roadblock.

In Series 2, Team Cassius entered 5th seeded "Cassius", a wedge-shaped robot armed with a front-pivoted flipper. Cassius was the first competitor in the show's history to "self right" (i.e. to turn itself over when it was upside down), and as such Garrod is often credited with inventing the so-called "srimech". Cassius also reached the Grand Final, but lost to Panic Attack.

In Series 3, Team Cassius entered 2nd seeded "Cassius 2", a similar robot to its predecessor "Cassius", which lost to Series 4 runner-up Pussycat in the 2nd round of the heats. His team then quit and never returned to the show, as their complaints about insufficient health and safety precautions were not listened to by the producers.

References

External links 
 We Love Rex Garrod on Facebook
 Interview on YouTube

1943 births
2019 deaths
British inventors
Deaths from Alzheimer's disease
Deaths from dementia in England
People from Mid Suffolk District
British speedway riders
Ipswich Witches riders
Scunthorpe Scorpions riders